Venet is a surname. Notable people with the surname include:

Bernar Venet (born 1941), French artist
Nick Venet (1936–1998), American record producer
Philippe Venet (1929–2021), French fashion designer

See also
Veneti (disambiguation)
Venets (disambiguation)
Vinet